This is a list of world lightweight boxing champions by organization, as recognized by four of the better-known sanctioning organizations:

 The World Boxing Association (WBA), founded in 1921 as the National Boxing Association (NBA),
 The World Boxing Council (WBC), founded in 1963,
 The International Boxing Federation (IBF), founded in 1983,
 The World Boxing Organization (WBO), founded in 1988

World

WBC

WBA

IBF

WBO

See also
 List of British world boxing champions

References

External links
 Ken Buchanan - Lightweight Champion of the World - Ken Buchanan site with detailed bio, statistics, full fights and more
 https://boxrec.com/media/index.php/National_Boxing_Association%27s_Quarterly_Ratings:_1942
 https://boxrec.com/media/index.php/National_Boxing_Association%27s_Quarterly_Ratings:_1943

Lightweight Champions

World boxing champions by weight class